Santosham or Santhosham means happiness in the Telugu and Tamil language, and may refer to:

Santosham (1955 film), a Telugu film starring N. T. Rama Rao
Santhosham (1998 film), a Tamil film starring Saravanan and Suvalakshmi
Santosham (2002 film), a Telugu film starring Akkineni Nagarjuna and Shriya Saran
Santosham (magazine), an Indian Telugu-language magazine related to Tollywood (Telugu)
Santhosham (2022 film), a Malayalam film film starring Amith Chakalakkal and Anu Sithara